The British Guild of Travel Writers Limited is a private company limited by guarantee formed in April 2015. 

This private company is the successor organisation to the erstwhile voluntary association known as the British Guild of Travel Writers. The latter was founded in 1960. The association and the successor company are known by the acronym BGTW. 

The company's registered office is at Great Blakenham near Ipswich in England. The company's board of directors is voted in once a year, with the Chair and Vice-Chair serving a term of a maximum of three years. The current Chair is travel writer Simon Willmore and the current Vice-Chair is blogger Susan Schwartz.

Members of the new limited company

The ten initial subscribers to the Memorandum of Association are automatically members of the new private company. Other members will be admitted in due course, provided that they meet the criteria for membership laid down in the Articles of Association. The antecedent voluntary association made provision for retired members (and others who were no longer professionally active) to retain a connection with BGTW as Associate Members. This category continues, but Associate Members will not be deemed to be members of British Guild of Travel Writers Limited under the terms of the Companies Act 2006.

Scope of members' work  

Texts, broadcasts and images created by members of the old voluntary association appear virtually daily in the UK media and on the Internet, and to a lesser extent in non-UK print and broadcast media, with BGTW members reporting on travel and tourism issues from across the world. Many Guild members are established writers of guide books and narrative travel books, others frequently lecture on their specialist areas, while yet others comment critically on the history of travel or travel writing or on contemporary issues in transport and tourism.

BGTW members write about destinations; they write about journeys, and they write about travel issues. The latter routinely include public transport, civil aviation, overland travel, ecotourism, slow travel, travel technology, consumer protection in the travel industry, medical tourism and travel medicine, and the development of and prospects for travel literature.

With the opportunities in travel writing shifting further away from print journalism, a diminishing number of BGTW members would describe themselves as journalists per se. But there are nonetheless still many members contributing to mainstream media. Narrative travel books written by current BGTW members have won the Dolman Best Travel Book Award and the Wales Book of the Year. The BGTW considers applications from those who "weave words with style, take wonderful pics or cut a dash in other travel media genres."

AGM and Yearbook
Until its dissolution in 2015, the association held an annual conference, restricted to members. The association's most recent annual meetings were held in the Scottish Highlands (2007), Malta (2008), York (2009), Tenerife (2010), Mussanah in Oman (2011), Boulogne on the north coast of France (2012), Zakopane in Poland (2013), Weimar in Germany (2014) and Milan (2015). In 2019 an event was held in Charleston, South Carolina. In 2022, an annual meeting was held in the Canary Islands.

From 2016 the Company's AGMs are conducted under the rules laid down by the Companies Act 2006, and so restricted strictly to company business; those members not in attendance will be able to take advantage of new arrangements for proxy voting. The first AGM held under the new regulations was held in Tenerife in January 2016. It was funded by Hume Whitehead, a London based public relations company.  

The association's Yearbook was usually published in March each year; it enjoyed circulated widely within the UK travel trade and was also available for purchase by the public. The last yearbook was published in May 2015, carrying the date 2015-2016. It is not known if the new company will continue to publish a yearbook of any kind.

BGTW awards programmes
Through its annual Tourism Awards, the voluntary association recognised innovation and excellence in the tourism industry, both in the British Isles and more widely. The awards were reserved for projects that make a creative contribution to the experience and understanding of travellers. The project must be environmentally and socially responsible. The new company has not announced if this awards programme will continue.

The award presentations were made each November at an annual awards dinner in London hosted on the eve of the World Travel Market (WTM). The BGTW voluntary association was often successful in securing sponsorship of its annual awards dinner including support from Las Vegas Convention and Visitors Authority and tourist authorities in Malta, Jersey, Turkey and Belgium. The successor company has not yet announced sponsorship arrangements for the 2015 dinner and subsequent events. 

At the annual awards dinner, the Guild had also made awards to its own members, recognising excellence in various categories of travel writing, as well as for travel photography, radio and television programmes related to travel, etc.  The principal award is for the Travel Writer of the Year, based upon a portfolio of about half a dozen published articles and evaluated by an independent panel of assessors.

The Guild also, from time to time, made a Lifetime Achievement Award to an individual who had made, over a sustained period, a notable and positive contribution to the development of worthwhile travel, either through published work or other initiatives. Recipients of the BGTW Lifetime Achievement Award include Hilary Bradt, the founder of the pioneering travel guidebook company Bradt Travel Guides, and the distinguished British travel writers Eric Newby and Patrick Leigh Fermor. The last such award was made in 2011.

For many years, the British Guild of Travel Writers ran an annual travel writing competition to encourage new writing talent. The programme was discontinued in early 2014.

References

External links
British Guild of Travel Writers website

Organizations established in 1960
Professional associations based in the United Kingdom
Organisations based in Suffolk
British writers' organisations
1960 establishments in the United Kingdom